Sir Gerard Herbert was an English commander during the Eighty Years' War and the Thirty Years' War. He participated in the Siege of Heidelberg (1622) and was defeated and killed by the Imperial-Spanish troops of Johan Tzerclaes, Count of Tilly and Don Gonzalo Fernández de Córdoba.

References

External links
 Zedlers Universallexicon, vol.47, p. 211
 At Westminster Abbey

English military personnel of the Eighty Years' War
English army officers
Year of birth missing
Year of death missing
English people of the Thirty Years' War